Central Vietnam ( or ), also known as Middle Vietnam or The Middle, formerly known as  by South Vietnam,  and Annam under French Indochina, is one of the three geographical regions within Vietnam.

The name Trung Bộ was used by the king Bảo Đại when he established administrative level higher than Province in 1945, instead of the Trung Kỳ which recalled the French occupation. This name was officially used by government of the Democratic Republic of Vietnam and is popularly used today.

Administration
Central Vietnam includes 3 administrative regions, which in turn comprises 19 First Tier units.

 Municipality (thành phố trực thuộc trung ương)

Of all 19 First Tier units, 1 is municipality and 18 are provinces.

See also
Northern, Central and Southern Vietnam

References

Regions of Vietnam